Buddha Polytechnic Institute, established in 2010, is a private polytechnic degree engineering college, a unit of Buddha Group of Institutions, situated in Gaya. It offers undergraduate degree engineering in electrical engineering, electronics, mechanical engineering and civil engineering. The college is affiliated with the State Board of Technical Education.

Admission process
The Bihar Combined Entrance Competitive Examination Board conducts the entrance test. Based on the Merit List of the Bihar Combined Entrance Competitive Examination, successful candidates have to go through counseling. For lateral entry in the second year, one must have passed Diploma in Engineering/B.Sc. and should be in the merit list of Bihar Combined Entrance Competitive Examination Board.

See also 
 List of institutions of higher education in Bihar
 Education in Bihar
 Education in India
 Buddha Institute of Technology

References

External links
 BCECE Board website
 Aryabhatta Knowledge University website
 DST, Bihar website

Engineering colleges in Bihar
Education in Gaya, India
Educational institutions established in 2010
Colleges affiliated to Aryabhatta Knowledge University
2010 establishments in Bihar